Corridors of Blissterday is the second studio album by Australian psychedelic rock band Pond, released on 4 June 2009 through Badminton Bandit. It was described as "a frenzied effort recorded live with an eight piece band at some point (nobody seems to remember exactly when) in 2009."

In March 2012 Pond member Jay Watson (drums, guitar) described their early work to Bryget Chrisfield of Inpress, "We were just a freeform, acid-rock jam band thing. We didn't really have songs or anything, you know. We did that for a while, the first two albums [Psychedelic Mango and Corridors Of Blissterday] are kinda like that, and then I think we thought that everyone thought we were just stoner idiots and so we wanted to prove – to ourselves – that we could write pop songs, choruses."

Track listing

References

2009 albums
Pond (Australian band) albums